Adenocarpus is a genus of flowering plants in the  family Fabaceae. It belongs to the subfamily Faboideae. The plants are broom-like shrubs with bright yellow flowers. The genus is native to the Mediterranean Basin and sub-Saharan Africa, but finds its highest diversity in Northwest Africa (Morocco, Algeria, and the Canary Islands) and the Iberian Peninsula.

Species
Adenocarpus comprises the following species:
 Adenocarpus anagyrifolius Coss. & Balansa

 Adenocarpus artemisiifolius Jahand. et al.
 Adenocarpus bacquei Batt. & Pit.
 Adenocarpus battandieri (Maire) Talavera

 Adenocarpus boudyi Batt. & Maire
 Adenocarpus cincinnatus (Ball) Maire

 Adenocarpus complicatus (L.) Gay
 subsp. bracteatus (Font Quer & Pau) Talavera & P. E. Gibbs
 subsp. complicatus (L.) Gay
 subsp. nainii (Maire) P. E. Gibbs
 Adenocarpus decorticans Boiss.
 Adenocarpus faurei Maire
 Adenocarpus foliolosus (Aiton) DC.

 Adenocarpus hispanicus (Lam.) DC.

 Adenocarpus mannii (Hook. f.) Hook. f.
 Adenocarpus ombriosus Ceballo & Ortuno

 Adenocarpus telonensis (Loisel.) DC.
 Adenocarpus umbellatus Batt.

 Adenocarpus viscosus (Willd.) Webb & Berthel.

Species names with uncertain taxonomic status
The status of the following species is unresolved:
 Adenocarpus aureus (Cav.) Pau
 Adenocarpus bivonii (C.Presl) C.Presl
 Adenocarpus brutius Brullo & De Marco & Siracusa
 Adenocarpus complicatus J. Gay
 Adenocarpus desertorum Castrov.
 Adenocarpus divaricatus Sweet
 Adenocarpus divaricatus (L'Hér.) Boiss.
 Adenocarpus lainzii (Castrov.) Castrov.
 Adenocarpus rodriguezi Sennen & Mauricio
 Adenocarpus samniticus Brullo & De Marco & Siracusa
 Adenocarpus subdecorticans Humbert & Maire
 Adenocarpus tenoreanus Brullo, Gangale & Uzunov
 Adenocarpus vallisoletanus Sennen & Pau

References

Genisteae
Fabaceae genera